Bálint Tömösvári (born 14 June 1998) is a Hungarian professional footballer who plays as a forward for Szolnok.

Club statistics

Updated to games played as of 15 December 2019.

References

1998 births
Living people
People from Szolnok
Association football forwards
Hungarian footballers
Hungary youth international footballers
Budapest Honvéd FC players
Budapest Honvéd FC II players
Kaposvári Rákóczi FC players
Győri ETO FC players
BFC Siófok players
Szolnoki MÁV FC footballers
Nemzeti Bajnokság I players
Nemzeti Bajnokság II players
Sportspeople from Jász-Nagykun-Szolnok County